Kaise Bani or Phulauri Bina chutney kaise bani (Bhojpuri: फुलउरी बिना चटनी कइसे बनी; IAST: phulaurī binā chaṭnī kaïse banï; Lit.: How will phulauri be made without Chutney) is a traditional Bhojpuri Folksong. It was first modified and released by Trinidadian singer Sundar Popo in his album Nana and Nani (1969). This song got immense popularity after that and remade by many different artists and used in albums and films like Ghar ki Izzat (1994), Dabangg 2 (2012). Its popularity led to the formation of a new Music genre named Chutney music, which is the fusion of Bhojpuri and Caribbean music.

Origin and meaning
This Bhojpuri Folk song went to Trinidad and Tobago along with the indentured labourers (Girmityas), who were taken to British colonies to work in sugarcane fields from Bhojpuri speaking region of India. In 1969 Sundar Popo released an album named Nana and Nani in which this song was mixed with English lyrics and music was also fused with Caribbean music. After this Babla & Kanchan recreated this song and released in 1982.

The Hookline Phulauri bina chutney kaise bani means, "how will the phulauri will made without chutney". Phulauri or Phoelaurie is a bhojpuri dish which is a deep fried ball made of highly seasoned mixture of ground Split pea and Gram flour. Phulauris are eaten with Chutney. The hookline literally says: "What is the purpose of making the Phulauri if Chutney is not there".

Sundar Popo Song

First modernized version of this folk song was released by Sundar Popo in Chutney music genre in his hit album Nana and Nani in 1969. Music in this song was the fusion of Bhojpuri folk and Caribbean pop. The lyrics was funny yet dark and was in English except the hookline which was in Bhojpuri.

Kanchan & Babla Song
In 1982, Babla & Kanchan recreated the song by Sundar Popo.

Other versions
The tune of this song was used in the 1994 song Rajāï Binā Ratiyā kaïse katī from the Bollywood film Ghar Ki Izzat, sung by Usha Mangeshkar and Jayshree Shivram.
This song was also recreated in the album Aara Hile Chhapra Hile, with the title Phulauri Bina Chutney Kaise bani sung by Kalpana Patowary and written by Vinay Bihari.
This song was recreated with the name Chatni kaise bani in the album Aagre Ka Ghaghra released by T-Series and sung by Anjali Jain.
This song was also remade which was sung by Mamta Sharma and Wajid Ali in the movie Dabangg 2 (2012) starring Salman Khan.

References

1969 songs
Chutney music
Bhojpuri folk music